Andem may refer to:

 Andem, Gabon
 A surname of Telugu speaking members of Reddy community living in Telangana, India.

People with the surname
 Julie Andem (born 1982), Norwegian screenwriter, director, and television producer
 Bassey William Andem (born 1968), Cameroonian footballer